The 1986–1988 French nuclear tests were a group of 24 nuclear tests conducted between 1986 and 1988. These tests followed the 1983–1985 French nuclear tests series and preceded the 1989–1991 French nuclear tests series.

References

French nuclear weapons testing
1986 in French Polynesia
1987 in France
1988 in France